Thomas Camperdown Fyfe (23 June 1870 in Timaru – 1947 in Hastings) was a self-taught New Zealand mountaineer from Timaru. He led the first ascent of Aoraki / Mount Cook (the highest mountain in New Zealand) on 25 December 1894, which included Jack Clarke and George Graham. Following the first Aoraki ascent Fyfe, who was introduced to climbing by Jack Adamson, went on to become the first appointed Chief Guide at the Hermitage Hotel at Mt Cook village.

References

New Zealand mountain climbers
People from Timaru
1870 births
1947 deaths